Nassarius margaritifer is a species of sea snail, a marine gastropod mollusk in the family Nassariidae, the Nassa mud snails or dog whelks.

Description
The shell size varies between 20 mm and 35 mm

Distribution
This species occurs in the Indian Ocean off Kenya, Tanzania and the Aldabra Atoll, in the Pacific Ocean off the Philippines

References

 Hombron, J.B. & Jacquinot, C.H. (1842-1854). Atlas d'histoire Naturelle zoologie par MM. Hombron et Jacquinot, chirurgiens de l'expédition. Voyage au Pole Sud et dans l'Océanie sur les corvettes l'Astrolabe et la Zélée éxecuté par ordre du roi pendant les années 1837–1838–1839–1840 sous le commandement de M. Dumont-d'Urville, capitaine de vaisseau, publié sous les auspices du département de la marine et sous la direction supérieure de M. Jacquinot, capitaine de vaisseau, commandant de la Zélée. Zoologie. Gide & Cie, Paris.
 Ruwa, R.K. (1989). Macrofaunal composition and zonation on sandy beaches at Gazi, Kanamai and Malindi Bay, Kenya. Kenya Journal of Sciences (Series B) 10 (1–2): 31–45
 * Cernohorsky W. O. (1984). Systematics of the family Nassariidae (Mollusca: Gastropoda). Bulletin of the Auckland Institute and Museum 14: 1–356

External links
 Quoy J.R.C. & Gaimard J.P. (1832-1835). Voyage de découvertes de l'"Astrolabe" exécuté par ordre du Roi, pendant les années 1826-1829, sous le commandement de M. J. Dumont d'Urville. Zoologie. 
 Adams, A. (1852-1853). Catalogue of the species of Nassa, a genus of gasteropodous Mollusca belonging to the family Buccinidae, in the collection of Hugh Cuming, Esq., with the description of some new species. Proceedings of the Zoological Society of London. (1851) 19: 94-112
 Cernohorsky W. O. (1984). Systematics of the family Nassariidae (Mollusca: Gastropoda). Bulletin of the Auckland Institute and Museum 14: 1–356
 

Nassariidae
Gastropods described in 1847